Inflation Blues is an album by Jack DeJohnette's Special Edition featuring Chico Freeman, John Purcell, and Rufus Reid, with Baikida Carroll added on four tracks, recorded in 1982 and released on the ECM label in 1983. The Allmusic review by Scott Yanow states, "this is a particularly strong outing by the 1982 edition of the group... it is not surprising that the music is adventurous yet quite coherent, with the solo and group statements being both spontaneous and logical. Recommended".

Track listing
All compositions by Jack DeJohnette
 "Starburst" - 9:11
 "Ebony" - 8:42
 "The Islands" - 8:36
 "Inflation Blues" - 6:43
 "Slowdown" - 6:24
Recorded September 1982 at Power Station, New York

Personnel
Jack DeJohnette: drums, piano, clavinet, vocal
Chico Freeman: tenor saxophone, soprano saxophone, bass clarinet
John Purcell: baritone saxophone, alto saxophone, flute, clarinet
Rufus Reid: bass
Baikida Carroll: trumpet (tracks 1 & 3-5)

References

Jack DeJohnette albums
1983 albums
ECM Records albums
Albums produced by Manfred Eicher